The 1948 Yale Bulldogs baseball team represented the Yale University in the 1948 NCAA baseball season. The Bulldogs played their home games at Yale Field. The team was coached by Ethan Allen in his 3rd season at Yale.

The Bulldogs advanced to the College World Series, falling to the USC Trojans two games to one in the best of three series.

Future president George H. W. Bush was a third baseman and captain on the team.

Roster

Schedule

Awards and honors 
Frank Quinn
All-America First team
 
Richard Mathews
All-America First team

References

Yale Bulldogs baseball seasons
College World Series seasons
Eastern Intercollegiate Baseball League baseball champion seasons
Yale Bull